Pristyn Care is a Gurugram based health-tech company that deals into minimal invasive medical and surgical interventions. The organization has a network of more than 700 partnered hospitals and 100 clinics. The company was started in 2018 and covers proctology, gynaecology, IVF, urology, vascular, otorhinolaryngology, laparoscopy, anaesthetics, and ophthalmology. 

Pristyn Care, on 10 November 2022, announced that it is in expansion mode with plans to induct 300 hospitals and 100 clinics in the southern part of India by end of next year. The expansion will take the total number of its network hospitals to 500 and clinics to 150, the company claims.

History 
Pristyn Care was founded in 2018 by Harsimarbir Singh, Dr. Vaibhav Kapoor, and Dr. Garima Sawhney.

In 2019, Pristyn Care had around 70 clinics with over 250 partnered hospitals across 14 cities, and 70 in-house surgeons. Over time, the company expanded the services and acquired more clinics, hospitals, and doctors. Currently, with an ecosystem of over 100 clinics, 700 partner hospitals, and 300 in-house super-specialty doctors, the company has established itself in over 40 cities across India.

Pristyn partnered with Urban Company to provide home-based online medical consultation and supplies in 2020 during COVID-19 Lockdown. It also donated 10,000 masks to Delhi police to support the control of the pandemic.

In December 2021, Pristyn Care underwent a Series E funding round in which Sequoia Capital valued the company at $1.4 billion, giving the company unicorn status.

Funding rounds 
As a healthcare delivery startup, Pristyn Care raised $4 million in the Series A round of funding from Sequoia Capital India in June 2019.

In December 2019, the company raised $12 million (₹85 crore) in a Series B funding round again led by Sequoia Capital India, Hummingbird Ventures, Greenoaks Capital, and AngelList.

In September 2020, Series C funding led by Hummingbird Ventures, Sequoia Capital, Greenoaks Capital, AngelList, Epiq Capital, and Redwood Trust raised ₹86.4 crores to further support the company's growth and vision.

In April 2021, Pristyn Care got $53 million in the Series D funding round led by Tiger Global Management. This funding increased the company's valuation to more than $550 million.

In the latest Series E funding round led by marquee investors, including Sequoia Capital, Tiger Global, Epiq Capital, Hummingbird Ventures, and Trifecta Capital, Pristyn Care raised $96 million.

Marketing campaigns 
In September 2021, Pristyn Care onboarded Hrithik Roshan for their marketing campaign titled "Surgery Mein Care". The campaign was released directly on Disney+ Hotstar and Star Sports. The campaign was designed by advertising agency BBDO, and Indian film writer and director Siddharth Anand was involved in its production.

Before this campaign, several other campaigns were also run by Pristyn Care starring Boman Irani, Dilip Joshi, Ravindra Jadeja, Chef Ranveer Brar, Anup Soni, Deepak Rathore, Sumeet Raghvan, and Vinay Pathak.

Acquisition 
In June, 2022, Pristyn Care acquired the health-tech platform Lybrate. As part of the acquisition, 150 employees from Lybrate had joined Pristyn Care.

Controversies 
In September 2022, Pristyn Care co-founder Harsimarbir Singh faced widespread backlash online following a LinkedIn post in which he shared his "interview hacks" designed to weed out prospective job candidates. Tactics Singh shared included making applicants wait six to eight hours to test their patience, scheduling interviews in early morning hours or late at night, scheduling interviews on Sunday and making outstation candidates to show up to the office the next day. Singh deleted his post, but screenshots of it circulated the internet, where it was negatively received.

Awards & recognition 

 Recognized as a Centre of Excellence in Proctology, Urology, and Gynaecology by the Meril Academy
 Co-founders Harsimarbir Singh, Dr. Vaibhav Kapoor, and Dr. Garima Sawhney included on Fortune India's 2021 40 under 40 list
 NABH Accredited Clinics and Partnered Hospitals 
 Listed as a Top 25 startup by LinkedIn India in 2019 and 2021

References 

Health care companies of India
Indian companies established in 2018